Jinan railway station is a railway station in Jinan, Shandong, China. It is on both the Beijing-Shanghai Railway and Qingdao-Jinan Passenger Railway. It accommodates intercity High Speed services towards destinations as Qingdao, Qingdao North, Yantai, Weihai, Rongcheng and Longkou.

Old Jinan stations
The predecessor of the current station was constructed in 1912. Serving the Jinpu Railway (Reorganised as part of Beijing-Shanghai Railway in 2007), it was designed by German architect Hermann Fischer. It was controversially demolished and rebuilt in 1992. Between 1915 and 1937, Jinan was home to another railway station of the same name, which served as the western terminus for the Jiaoji Railway, the station building of which is still extant and has since turned into a museum.

Future Development 
It is planned to build a new station building to the north of the railway. Construction is expected to begin in January 2023.

Metro station
The station is served by Jinan Railway Station North station on Line 2 of the Jinan Metro.

See also
 Jinan North railway station
 Jinan West railway station
 Jinan East railway station
 Daminghu railway station (near Daming Lake)
 Rail transport in China

References

External links

Railway stations in Shandong
Railway stations in China opened in 1904
Transport in Jinan
Buildings and structures in Jinan